{{Infobox
| title            = Africell Group
| image            = 
| header1          = 
| label1           = Type
| data1            = Private limited company
| header2          = 
| label2           = Operating markets
| data2            = The Gambia Sierra Leone  Democratic Republic of the Congo  Angola
| header3          = 
| label3           = Founded
| data3            = 2001
| header4          = 
| label4           = Headquarters
| data4            = London, UK
| header5          = 
| label5           = Key People
| data5            = {{Unbulleted list| Ziad DalloulGroup Chairman and CEO|}}
| header6          = 
| label6           = Industry
| data6            = Telecommunications
| header7          = 
| label7           = Products
| data7            = Mobile telephony Internet services Mobile money
| label8           = Incorporated
| data8            = UK
| data9            = www.africell.com
| label9           = Website
| label10          = Hello
}}Africell Group''' is a mobile technology company providing voice, messaging, data, mobile money and other integrated telecoms services to almost 20 million subscribers across Africa.

Company overview 
Africell was founded in 2001. It has US ownership and is headquartered in London, United Kingdom. The company has approximately 10,000 direct and outsourced employees and currently operates in four countries – The Gambia, Sierra Leone, Democratic Republic of Congo and Angola.

Africell is a market leader in The Gambia and Sierra Leone, with approximately 60% market share of the telecoms sectors in each. In Democratic Republic of Congo, Africell has between 20 and 25% market share in the provinces in which it is active. There has been significant subscriber growth in all markets since 2010. As of January 2023, Africell has almost 20 million subscribers. Its Africell Impact Foundation was launched in July 2022.

Africell is among the fastest-growing mobile telecommunications companies in Africa. The group is undergoing rapid expansion due to strong demographic trends in Africa (in terms of age, education, urbanisation and other factors), deepening telecoms penetration in most African countries, and the increasing availability of affordable smartphones. In addition to investing in mobile network operations and telecommunications infrastructure, Africell's strategy involves developing fintech products and services such as micro-payments, micro-insurance and micro-finance which - in addition to helping individual customers - have a multiplier effect on wider economic growth in Africa.

In January 2021, it was announced that Africell had won a competitive international tender process for a telecommunications license in Angola. Africell launched services in Angola in April 2022, the first new or independent operator in two decades to do so.

History 
Africell was founded in 2001 by US entrepreneur Ziad Dalloul. Africell launched its first commercial operations in The Gambia in 2001, before entering Sierra Leone in 2005 and building up a solid market leadership position in both West African countries. Since then, Africell Group has expanded south and east, into Democratic Republic of Congo (2012) and Uganda (2014). Africell's strategy is to move into markets in which it can "make a positive difference" in terms of reducing prices, covering more territory, and improving internet speed and reliability. In January 2021, after winning a competitive international public tender process, Africell declared its plans to establish a mobile network and start commercial operations in Angola by the end of 2021. Africell ended services in Uganda in October 2021, having been present in the country since 2014.
In 2018, it was announced that Africell group had secured a $100m loan facility from the US Government's International Development Finance Corporation (DFC). DFC's substantial investment in Africell followed a strict due diligence process and reflects a policy goal of the US government to significantly increase its commercial investments in Africa. In May 2022, Secretary of State Antony Blinken highlighted Africell as an example of US investment in sub-Saharan Africa making "real impact" and advancing "security and transparency" in the region.
Africell launched the Africell Impact Foundation in June 2022.

Operations 
Africell is the predominant mobile network provider in The Gambia and Sierra Leone and growing rapidly in Democratic Republic of Congo and Angola, both of which are considered high potential markets for the African telecoms sector. Africell's activity is directed from its group headquarters in London.

The Gambia 
Africell launched operations in Gambia in 2001. Africell has been the market leader in the country since 2006 in terms of the number of subscribers, and it boasts 93% territorial coverage. Africell offers 2G, 3G and 4G services in Gambia and the country is the Africell operating market with the highest percentage penetration of data services. Africell is well-respected in Gambia, both as a mobile network provider and as a significant private sector employer, and the company known to have the widest coverage and the highest quality network structure with services available to almost 100% of the Gambian population.

Sierra Leone 

Africell launched commercial operations in Sierra Leone in 2005. The company extended its footprint further in 2009 through the acquisition of Tigo Sierra Leone. Today, Africell's network covers more than 92% of the population. Africell has been the market leader in Sierra Leone since 2009, with approximately 4.2 million active subscribers and an extensive portfolio of 3G and 4G services. Africell's growth in Sierra Leone is driven by increasing data revenues, robust commercial promotions with data products accounting for a steadily increasing share of customer recharges over time.

During the Ebola epidemic which struck Sierra Leone and other West African states between 2014 and 2016, Africell played a prominent role as a local private sector partner to the government and international agencies battling the virus on the ground, deploying its hardware, telecommunications services, media platforms and distribution network to support the anti-Ebola campaign. Africell has earned a reputation in the nation as the premier company in terms of meeting their corporate social responsibilities. However, this has created much needed attention in the area they operate.

Democratic Republic of Congo 
Africell launched services in Democratic Republic of Congo in 2012, since which date the company has acquired over 5 million active subscribers. Africell currently offers 2G, 3G and 4G coverage in the metropolitan and population-dense provinces of Kinshasa, Kongo Central and Haut-Katanga, and plans to expand into new provinces in 2021 and beyond.

Uganda 
Africell entered Uganda by acquiring Orange Uganda in November 2014. Following the transaction, Africell doubled its number of active subscribers and eventually served c. 1.1 million active subscribers 3G and 4G services. Africell ended services in Uganda in October 2021 after announcing a strategic reorientation of the Group towards more impactful and higher-growth market opportunities in west and central Africa.

Angola 
In January 2021, following a competitive international public tender process for a Unified Communications Service License in Angola, Africell was named by the Angolan government as the winning bidder. At the time of the award, Africell stated an intention to start commercial operations in the country in 2022, which it did in April 2022. The entry of Africell Group (an experienced private international operator) into the telecoms sector in Angola will have a positive impact on the market as a result of more competition, better pricing, and improved network quality. In July 2021 Africell announced a major partnership with Nokia, under the terms of which the Finnish company is its main supplier of network equipment in Angola. Africell is projected to create several thousand local jobs within five years  and help liberalise an economy which (some have argued) has historically been inhospitable to overseas investment. In May 2022 U.S. Deputy Secretary of State Wendy R. Sherman visited Africell's office in Luanda, Angola, during a diplomatic tour of southern Africa, describing Africell's activities in Angola as "phenomenal" and commending the company for providing digital skills and jobs to young Angolans. Africell's 5G network - the first in Angola - was activated in July 2022. Africell launched services in Angola's Benguela Province in December 2022.

References 

Telecommunications companies of the Gambia
Telecommunications companies established in 2000